Mercy-le-Haut is a commune in the Meurthe-et-Moselle department in north-eastern France. Albert Lebrun, President of France between 1932 and 1940, was born in the town. Since the 2020 municipal elections, Roland Bourgeois has been the mayor of Mercy-le-Haut.

See also
Communes of the Meurthe-et-Moselle department

References

Mercylehaut